Jeanne Rucar (Lille, 29 February 1908  –  Mexico City, 4 November 1994) was a French-born Mexican professional actress and gymnast. In 1990, she authored Memoir of a Woman without a Piano. Jeanne Rucar was married to Luis Buñuel for forty-nine years, from 1934 until his death in 1983.

References

1908 births
1994 deaths
French gymnasts
French emigrants to Mexico
Sportspeople from Lille